Oman competed at the 2011 World Aquatics Championships in Shanghai, China between July 16 and 31, 2011.

Open water swimming

Men

References

Nations at the 2011 World Aquatics Championships
2011 in Omani sport